The 2023 Campeonato Brasileiro Feminino A-1 (officially the Brasileirão Feminino Neoenergia 2023 for sponsorship reasons) is the 11th season of the Campeonato Brasileiro de Futebol Feminino Série A1, the top level of women's football in Brazil, and the 7th edition in a Série A1 since its establishment in 2016. The tournament is organized by the Brazilian Football Confederation (CBF). It started on 24 February and will end on 17 September 2023.

Sixteen teams will compete in the league – the top twelve teams from the previous season, as well as four teams promoted from the 2022 Série A2 (Athletico Paranaense, Bahia, Ceará and Real Ariquemes)

Corinthians are the defending champions.

Format
In the group stage, each team will play once against the other fifteen teams. Top eight teams will qualify for the final stages. Quarter-finals, semi-finals and finals will be played on a home-and-away two-legged basis.

Teams

Number of teams by state

Stadiums and locations

Personnel and kits

Foreign players
The clubs can have a maximum of five foreign players in their Campeonato Brasileiro squads per match, but there is no limit of foreigners in the clubs' squads.

Players holding Brazilian dual nationality
They do not take foreign slot.

  Suzane Pires (Ferroviária)

Group stage
In the group stage, each team will play on a single round-robin tournament. The top eight teams will advance to the quarter-finals of the knockout stages. The teams will be ranked according to points (3 points for a win, 1 point for a draw, and 0 points for a loss). If tied on points, the following criteria will be used to determine the ranking: 1. Wins; 2. Goal difference; 3. Goals scored; 4. Fewest red cards; 5. Fewest yellow cards; 6. Draw in the headquarters of the Brazilian Football Confederation (Regulations Article 15).

Group A

Results

Final stages
Starting from the quarter-finals, the teams will play a single-elimination tournament with the following rules:
Quarter-finals, semi-finals and finals will be played on a home-and-away two-legged basis, with the higher-seeded team hosting the second leg.
If tied on aggregate, the penalty shoot-out will be used to determine the winners (Regulations Article 16).
Extra time will not be played and away goals rule will not be used in final stages.

Starting from the semi-finals, the teams will be seeded according to their performance in the tournament. The teams will be ranked according to overall points. If tied on overall points, the following criteria will be used to determine the ranking: 1. Overall wins; 2. Overall goal difference; 3. Draw in the headquarters of the Brazilian Football Confederation (Regulations Article 20).

Bracket

Quarter-finals

|}

Group B

Winners advance to the semi-finals.

Group C

Winners advance to the semi-finals.

Group D

Winners advance to the semi-finals.

Group E

Winners advance to the semi-finals.

Semi-finals

|}

Group F

Winners advance to the finals.

Group G

Winners advance to the finals.

Finals

|}

Group H

References

Women's football leagues in Brazil
2023 in Brazilian football